Sibiryakov is a surname.

Sibiryakov may also refer to:

Places 
 Mount Sibiryakov, in Antarctica
 Sibiryakov Island, in the Kara Sea
 Sibiryakov Island (Primorsky Krai), in the Sea of Japan

Ships 
 A. Sibiryakov (icebreaker), launched 1909, sunk 1942
 Jääkarhu, Finnish icebreaker launched 1926, turned over to Soviets in 1945 and renamed Sibiryakov, broken up 1972